Sandspit may refer to:

 Sandspit, British Columbia, a town on Haida Gwaii, British Columbia, Canada
 Sandspit, New Zealand, a suburb of Auckland, New Zealand
 Sandspit Beach, a major tourist site in Karachi, Pakistan
 Sandspit (landform), a deposition landform found off coasts